São Cristóvão Station is a railway station in São Cristóvão, Rio de Janeiro which  is serviced by the Rio de Janeiro Metro and SuperVia.

Supervia station

History 
São Cristóvão Station was opened on 16 July 1859, being part of the first section of the Central do Brasil Railroad, between Rio de Janeiro and Nova Iguaçu. With the growth of the city of Rio de Janeiro, passenger trains started to run with ever increasing frequency, and suburban trains started running in the 1920s. During the electrification works of the Central do Brasil railroad (1934–1937), São Cristóvão Station was reconstructed, with a mezzanine over the tracks.

With the expansion of services on the railroad between 1963 and 1972, new platforms were built, and the mezzanine over the station was expanded. Despite this, the station could not keep up with the number of passengers. On 12 October 1974, during the Children's Day festivities in the Quinta da Boa Vista, severe overcrowding inside the station caused 4 deaths and hundreds of injuries.

With the construction of São Cristóvão Metro Station between 1976 and 1981, plans were made to remodel and integrate the suburban rail station to the metro, though they never left the drawing board. In 1984, São Cristóvão Station was transferred from the Federal Railroad Network to the Brazilian Urban Train Company (CBTU), which made new plans to remodel the station, but those plans also never left the drawing board due to a lack of funds.

After the privatization of urban trains in Greater Rio de Janeiro and of the station in 1998, a new plan for the station was presented in 2000 through a national architecture competition. Despite the winning entry being created by Mario Biselli and José Paulo de Bem (who designed Sé Station in São Paulo), the plan was never acted on due to a lack of funds. Only in the 2010s would Supervia and the Rio de Janeiro State government start a new reconstruction project. Financed by the Brazilian Development Bank, the plan was commissioned with the aid of private companies including Planorcon, LZD Arquitetos and RVBA Arquitetos, but the reconstruction itself would be done by EBTE Engenharia, and was completed on 27 July 2016.

Platforms 
Platform 1A: Towards Deodoro (Stopper)
Platform 1B: Towards Central do Brasil (Stopper)
Platform 2C: Towards Japeri and Santa Cruz (Express)
Platform 2D: Towards Central do Brasil (Express)
Platform 3E: Towards Belford Roxo and Gramacho
Platform 3F: Towards Central do Brasil

Metro Station

History 

The first plans for São Cristóvão Metro Station were presented (along with the plans for Triagem, Maracanã and Maria da Graça Metro Stations) in June 1976 by Projeto Arquitetos Associados Ltda. (PAAL), a private company owned by Sabino Machado Barroso, Jaime Zettel and José de Anchieta Leal, and said plans called for a direct integration to the existing train station.

The construction of São Cristóvão Metro Station was contracted out by the Rio de Janeiro state government to Cetenco Engenharia S.A. and Ecisa - Engenharia, Comercio e Industria S/A for the value of 510 million cruzeiros and started on 16 March 1977. Despite the initial deadline of 600 days after the start of construction, São Cristóvão Metro Station was only inaugurated on 19 November 1981.

Entrances 
The station had three entrances in the past: Radial Oeste and RFFSA in the northern end and Senador Furtado in the southern end, but now it has four entrances: Praça da Bandeira, Radial Oeste Avenue, Maracanã Station and the Quinta da Boa Vista.

References

External links 
 Metrô Rio webpage
 Supervia webpage

Metrô Rio stations
SuperVia stations